Euchloe lotta, the desert marble, is a species of butterfly that occurs in the interior of British Columbia, Canada.

It is mostly white with black markings on the topside of the forewing tips and body. The underside has greenish-grey veins especially in the hindwing. The wingspan is from 38 to 40 mm.

The desert marble's flight season in North America is from April to May. It inhabits sagelands, deserts, juniper woodland, dry, rocky areas, dry ravines, and canyon walls.

Larvae feed on Arabis furcata, Arabis sparsiflora, Arabis bolboellii, and Halimolobos whitedi.

References

Euchloe
Butterflies of North America
Butterflies described in 1898